Altınbeşik Cave National Park, established on August 31, 1994, is a national park in southern Turkey. It is located in the İbradı district of Antalya Province.

Properties 
Altınbeşik Cave is the largest below surface lake cave in Turkey. Its estimated arms reach 2200 meters. The depth of the lake reaches 15 meters in some regions. Altınbeşik Cave is suitable for visiting in summer and autumn. Since the water level of the cave rises in winter and spring, it is closed to visitors.

References

National parks of Turkey
Caves of Turkey
Geography of Antalya Province
Caves of Antalya Province
Tourist attractions in Antalya Province
İbradı District
1994 establishments in Turkey
Protected areas established in 1994